Betula pubescens 'Pendula', or Weeping Downy Birch, is a weeping tree and a cultivar of Betula pubescens, the Downy Birch. It was first described by Schelle in 1903. No trees are known to survive of this cultivar.

Description
A weeping tree with a leader and with pendulous branches.

Accessions
Very little is known of this cultivar and it never seems to have been widely cultivated.

Synonymy
Betula pubescens f. pendula Schelle in L.Beissner, E.Schelle & H.Zabel, Handb. Laubholzben.: 53 (1903), nom. nud.

References

External links

pubescens 'Pendula'
Weeping trees
Extinct cultivars